('beyond the powers') is a Latin phrase used in law to describe an act which requires legal authority but is done without it. Acts that are  may equivalently be termed "valid", and those that are  termed "invalid".

Legal issues relating to  can arise in a variety of contexts:
 Companies and other legal persons sometimes have limited legal capacity to act, and attempts to engage in activities beyond their legal capacities may be .
 Similarly, statutory and governmental bodies may have limits upon the acts and activities which they legally engage in.
 Subordinate legislation which is purported passed without the proper legal authority may be invalid as beyond the powers of the authority which issued it.

Corporate law 

In corporate law,  describes acts attempted by a corporation that are beyond the scope of powers granted by the corporation's objects clause, its articles of incorporation, its by-laws, similar founding documents, or laws authorizing a corporation's formation. Acts attempted by a corporation that are beyond the scope of its charter are void or voidable. 

 An  transaction cannot be ratified by shareholders, even if they wish it to be ratified.
 The doctrine of estoppel usually precluded reliance on the defense of  where the transaction was fully performed by one party.
 A fortiori, a transaction which was fully performed by both parties could not be attacked.
 If the contract was fully executory, the defense of  might be raised by either party.
 If the contract was partially performed, and the performance was held to be insufficient to bring the doctrine of estoppel into play, a suit for quasi-contract for recovery of benefits conferred was available.

Several modern developments relating to corporate formation have limited the probability that  acts will occur. Except in the case of non-profit corporations (including municipal corporations), this legal doctrine is obsolescent; within recent years, almost all business corporations are chartered to allow them to transact any lawful business. The Model Business Corporation Act of the United States states that: "The validity of corporate action may not be challenged on the ground that the corporation lacks or lacked power to act." The doctrine still has some life among non-profit corporations or state-created corporate bodies established for a specific public purpose, such as universities or charities.

United Kingdom

That result was commercially unpalatable, and led to companies being formed with extremely wide and generic objects clauses permitting a company to engage in all manner of commercial activities.  

The position was changed by statute by the Companies Act 1985 which largely abolished the doctrine in relation to commercial companies.

In many jurisdictions, such as Australia, legislation provides that a corporation has all the powers of a natural person plus others; also, the validity of acts which are made  is preserved.

United States
According to American laws, the concept of  can still arise in the following kinds of activities in some states:
 Charitable or political contributions
 Guaranty of indebtedness of another
 Loans to officers or directors
 Pensions, bonuses, stock option plans, job severance payments, and other fringe benefits
 The power to acquire shares of other corporations
 The power to enter into a partnership

Constitutional law

Under constitutional law, particularly in Canada and the United States, constitutions give federal and provincial or state governments various powers. To go outside those powers would be ; for example, although the court did not use the term in striking down a federal law in United States v. Lopez on the grounds that it exceeded the constitutional authority of Congress, the Supreme Court still declared the law to be .

According to Article 15.2 of the Irish constitution, the Oireachtas (parliament) is the sole lawmaking body in the Republic of Ireland. In the case of CityView Press v AnCo, however, the Supreme Court of Ireland held that the Oireachtas may delegate certain powers to subordinate bodies through primary legislation, so long as these delegated powers allow the delegatee only to further the principles and policies laid down by the Oireachtas in primary legislation and not craft new principles or policies themselves. Any piece of primary legislation that grants the power to make public policy to a body other than the Oireachtas is unconstitutional; however, as there is a presumption in Irish constitutional law that the Oireachtas acts within the confines of the constitution, any legislation passed by the Oireachtas must be interpreted in such a way as to be constitutionally valid where possible.

Thus, in a number of cases where bodies other than the Oireachtas were found to have used powers granted to them by primary legislation to make public policy, the impugned primary legislation was read in such a way that it would not have the effect of allowing a subordinate body to make public policy. In these cases, the primary legislation was held to be constitutional, but the subordinate or secondary legislation, which amounted to creation of public policy, was held to be  the primary legislation and was struck down.

In UK constitutional law,  describes patents, ordinances and the like enacted under the prerogative powers of the Crown that contradict statutes enacted by the Crown-in-Parliament. Almost unheard of in modern times,  acts by the Crown or its servants were previously a major threat to the rule of law.

Boddington v British Transport Police is an example of an appeal heard by House of Lords that contested that a bylaw was beyond the powers conferred to it under section 67 of the Transport Act 1962.

Administrative law
Narrow  applies if an administrator did not have the substantive power to make a decision or it was wrought with procedural defects. Broad  applies if there is an abuse of power (e.g., Wednesbury unreasonableness or bad faith) or a failure to exercise an administrative discretion (e.g., acting at the behest of another or unlawfully applying a government policy) or application of discretionary powers in irrational and wrong way. Either doctrine may entitle a claimant to various prerogative writs, equitable remedies or statutory orders if they are satisfied.

United Kingdom
However, together with unreasonableness, was mentioned much earlier by Lord Russell in the well-known case, Kruse v Johnson, regarding challenging by-laws and other rules. Anisminic is better known for not depriving courts of their jurisdiction to declare a decision a nullity, even if a statute expressly prevents the decision being subject to judicial review. Further cases such as Bromley LBC v Greater London Council and Council of Civil Service Unions v Minister for the Civil Service have sought to refine the doctrine.

In Hammersmith and Fulham London Borough Council v Hazell the House of Lords held that interest rate swaps entered into by local authorities (a popular method of circumventing statutory restrictions on local authorities borrowing money at that time) were all  and void, sparking a raft of satellite litigation.

See also
Judicial activism
Judicial Review in English Law
Mark Elliott (St Catharine's College, Cambridge proposes the modified  doctrine for administrative law, placing it firmly in the correct constitutional setting. (The Ultra Vires Doctrine in a Constitutional Setting: Still the Central Principle of Administrative Law [1999] Cambridge Law Journal Vol. 58 129)
Precedent

Notes

Robert W. Hamilton. The Law of Corporation  4th Edition, 1996 West Group

Administrative law
Latin legal terminology